Einar Mangset (15 November 1893 – 6 January 1992) was a Norwegian sprinter. He competed in the men's 400 metres at the 1920 Summer Olympics.

References

1893 births
1992 deaths
Athletes (track and field) at the 1920 Summer Olympics
Norwegian male sprinters
Olympic athletes of Norway
Place of birth missing